The 1975–76 Ice hockey Bundesliga season was the 18th season of the Ice hockey Bundesliga, the top level of ice hockey in Germany. 10 teams participated in the league, and Berliner Schlittschuhclub won the championship.

Regular season

References

External links
Season on hockeyarchives.info

Eishockey-Bundesliga seasons
Ger
Bundesliga